Ivory Mills is a , historic grist mill complex located at White Hall, Harford County, Maryland, United States. It consists of six standing 19th century frame buildings and structures: mill, miller's house, barn, corncrib, carriage house, and chicken house. The property also includes the ruins of a stone spring house, and the stone abutments of a frame, Federal-era covered bridge. The focus of the complex is the three-story stone and frame mill building built about 1818. The ground story is constructed of coursed stone rubble and the upper stories are clapboard. The family first started a mill on this site in 1781, and this mill ceased functioning in the 1920s.

Ivory Mills was listed on the National Register of Historic Places in 1997.

References

External links
, including photo from 1996, Maryland Historical Trust website

Grinding mills in Maryland
Buildings and structures in Harford County, Maryland
Industrial buildings completed in 1781
National Register of Historic Places in Harford County, Maryland
Grinding mills on the National Register of Historic Places in Maryland